is a manga series written and illustrated by Tamiki Wakaki, and serialized by Shogakukan in the manga magazine Weekly Shōnen Sunday since April 9, 2008, until its finale at chapter 268. The series follows high school student Keima Katsuragi, who unknowingly accepted a contract with the Demons of Hell, and is now forced to capture escaped spirits in the city. The chapters have been compiled into 26 tankōbon volumes, published in Japan by Shogakukan. The first volume was released on July 11, 2008, and the last one on June 18, 2014. The series is licensed in South Korea by Haksan Culture Company. The first two volumes were released simultaneously in August 2009, with a limited edition supplement for each.



Volumes list

See also

List of The World God Only Knows characters
List of The World God Only Knows episodes

References

World God Only Knows, The
The World God Only Knows